The 1915 Kilmarnock Burghs by-election was held on 28 May 1915.  The by-election was held due to the incumbent Liberal MP, William Glynne Gladstone, being killed in action in the First World War.  It was won by the Liberal candidate Hon. Alexander Shaw, who was unopposed.  It was the last election held in Kilmarnock Burghs before the seat was abolished in 1918.

References

1915 in Scotland
1910s elections in Scotland
Politics of Kilmarnock
1915 elections in the United Kingdom
By-elections to the Parliament of the United Kingdom in Scottish constituencies
Unopposed by-elections to the Parliament of the United Kingdom (need citation)
May 1915 events